Taipei Community Services Center, also called The Community Services Center, is a Taipei-based non-profit organization.

Publications 
The center publishes several items, including: "Taipei Living" a large information book on living in Taipei, "Centered on Taipei" a magazine on Taiwan lifestyle, Taipei guide books, "Taxi Cards!" common Chinese phrases, "Taipei City Map", "Taiwan A-Z", a guide to Taiwan culture.

See also
 Taiwan
 Taipei

References

Additional sources
 
 
 
 
 Amcham; American Chamber of Commerce In Taipei

External links
 Official website

1987 establishments in Taiwan
Non-profit organizations based in Taiwan
Organizations based in Taipei
Organizations established in 1987